Kor Sarr (13 December 1975 – 18 February 2019) was a Senegalese professional football player and manager.

Career
Born in Pikine, Sarr played as a striker in France for Beauvais, Laon, Angoulême, Caen and Ouistreham.

After retiring as a player, Sarr managed Senegalese clubs AS Pikine and RS Yoff.

Later life and death
Sarr died on 18 February 2019 in Paris at the age of 43.

References

1975 births
2019 deaths
Senegalese footballers
AS Beauvais Oise players
US Laon players
Angoulême Charente FC players
Stade Malherbe Caen players
Ligue 2 players
Championnat National players
Association football forwards
Senegalese football managers
AS Pikine managers
Senegalese expatriate footballers
Senegalese expatriate sportspeople in France
Expatriate footballers in France